Heat Wave is a 1982 studio album by vibraphonist Cal Tjader and jazz singer Carmen McRae. Tjader died four months after the completion of Heat Wave, it was his final recording.

The album was arranged by pianists Mark Levine and Marshall Otwell. McRae and Tjader did not get on well during the recording, and Tjader later overdubbed his parts without McRae present. McRae chose to sing "Besame Mucho" in its original Spanish language lyrics, and Willie Bobo helped her with the pronunciation.

Heat Wave peaked at 25 on Billboard's Jazz Albums chart.

Reception

Allmusic awarded the album four stars and reviewer Scott Yanow said that "The potentially exciting combination does not really come off that well...The musicians had little to do. McRae sounds OK in the Latin setting, but does not uplift the diverse material...and the effort overall is somewhat forgettable and disappointing".

Track listing
 "Heat Wave" (Irving Berlin) – 3:07
 "All in Love Is Fair" (Stevie Wonder) – 4:27
 "Besame Mucho" (Sunny Skylar, Consuelo Velázquez) – 5:26
 "Evil Ways" (Sonny Henry) – 5:15
 "Do Nothin' Till You Hear from Me" (Duke Ellington, Bob Russell) – 3:12
 "Love" (Ralph Blane, Hugh Martin) – 3:06
 "Upside Down (Flor de Lis)" (Djavan, Regina Wernech) – 4:33
 "The Visit" (Ivan Lins, Vítor Martins, Wernech) – 4:13
 "Speak Low" (Ogden Nash, Kurt Weill) – 4:51
 "Don't You Worry 'Bout a Thing" (Wonder) – 3:42

Personnel
Performance
Cal Tjader - vibraphone
Carmen McRae - vocals
Marshall Otwell - piano, arranger
Mark Levine - piano, arranger
Rob Fisher - bass
Vince Lateano - drums
Poncho Sanchez - congas, percussion
Ramon Banda - percussion, timbales
Al Bent - trombone
Mike Heathman - trombone

Production
Phil Edwards - engineer
Leonard Feather - liner notes
Carl Jefferson - producer

References

1982 albums
Albums produced by Carl Jefferson
Cal Tjader albums
Carmen McRae albums
Concord Records albums